The Constitution of the State of Ohio is the basic governing document of the State of Ohio, which in 1803 became the 17th state to join the United States of America.  Ohio has had three constitutions since statehood was granted.

Ohio was created from the easternmost portion of the Northwest Territory.  In 1787, the Congress of the Confederation of the United States passed the Northwest Ordinance, establishing a territorial government and providing that "[t]here shall be formed in the said territory, not less than three nor more than five states."  The Ordinance prohibited slavery and provided for freedom of worship, the right of habeas corpus and trial by jury, and the right to make bail except for capital offenses.  Ohio courts have noted that the Northwest Ordinance "was ever considered as the fundamental law of the territory."

1802 Constitution

The Ohio territory's population grew steadily in the 1790s and early 19th century.  Congress passed an enabling bill to establish a new state, which President Thomas Jefferson signed into law on April 30, 1802.  A state constitutional convention was held in November 1802 in Chillicothe, Ohio, and it adopted what became known as the 1802 Constitution.  Largely due to the perception that territorial governor Arthur St. Clair had ruled heavy-handedly, the constitution provided for a "weak" governor and judiciary, and vested virtually all power in a bicameral legislature, known as the General Assembly. Congress simply recognized the existence of the "state of Ohio" rather than passing a separate resolution declaring Ohio a state as it had done and would do with other new states. On February 19, 1803, President Jefferson signed the bill into law.  It provided that Ohio "had become one of the United States of America," and that Federal law "shall have the same force and effect within the said State of Ohio, as elsewhere within the United States."

Many tax protesters use this as an argument that Ohio was not a state until 1953. But see Bowman v. United States, 920 F. Supp. 623 n.1 (E.D. Pa. 1995) (discussing the 1953 joint Congressional resolution that confirmed Ohio’s status as a state retroactive to 1803).

The first General Assembly first met in Chillicothe, the new state capital, on March 1, 1803.  This has come to be considered the date of Ohio statehood.

The constitution provided for amendment only by convention. An attempt in 1819 was rejected by voters.

1851 Constitution
In the early decades of statehood, it became clear that the General Assembly was disproportionately powerful as compared to the executive and judicial branches.  Much of state business was conducted through private bills, and partisan squabbling greatly reduced the ability of state government to do its work.  The legislature widely came to be perceived as corrupt, subsidizing private companies and granting special privileges in corporate charters.  State debt also exploded between 1825 and 1840.  A new constitution, greatly redressing the checks and balances of power, was drafted by a convention in 1850-51, as directed by the voters, and subsequently adopted in a statewide referendum on June 17, 1851, taking effect on September 1 of that year.  This is the same constitution under which the state of Ohio operates.  The later "constitutions" were viewed as such, but in reality were large-scale revisions.

1873 Constitutional Convention
A constitutional convention in 1873, chaired by future Chief Justice of the United States Morrison R. Waite, proposed a new constitution that would have provided for annual sessions of the legislature, a veto for the governor which could be overridden by a three-fifths vote of each house, establishment of state circuit courts, eligibility of women for election to school boards, and restrictions on municipal debt. Delegates proposed the creation of circuit courts to relieve the Ohio Supreme Court's backlog of cases. The proposed document also made these circuits the final arbiter of facts. Waite took a leading role in this specific proposal. It was soundly defeated by the voters in August 1873.

1912 Constitution
In the Progressive Era, pent-up demand for reform led to the convening of another constitutional convention in 1912.  The delegates were generally progressive in their outlook, and noted Ohio historian George W. Knepper wrote,  "It was perhaps the ablest group ever assembled in Ohio to consider state affairs."  Several national leaders addressed the convention, including President William Howard Taft, an Ohioan; former president (and Bull Moose Party candidate) Theodore Roosevelt; three-time presidential candidate William Jennings Bryan; California's progressive governor Hiram Johnson; and Ohio's own reform-minded Gov. Judson Harmon.

Recalling how the 1873 convention's work had all been for naught, the 1912 convention drafted and submitted to the voters a series of amendments to the 1851 Constitution.  The amendments expanded the state's bill of rights, provided for voter-led initiative and referendum, established civil service protections, and granted the governor a line-item veto in appropriation bills.  Other amendments empowered the legislature to fix the hours of labor, establish a minimum wage and a workers compensation system, and address a number of other progressive measures.  A home rule amendment was proposed for Ohio cities with populations over 5,000.

On September 3, 1912, despite strong conservative opposition, voters adopted 33 of the 41 proposed amendments.  It was so sweeping a change to the 1851 Constitution that most legal scholars consider it to have become a new "1912 Constitution."  Among the eight losing proposed amendments were female suffrage, the use of voting machines, the regulation of outdoor advertising and abolition of the death penalty.  Voters also rejected a proposal to strike the word "white" from the 1851 Constitution's definition of voter eligibility.  Although black people could vote in all State and Federal elections in Ohio due to the Fifteenth Amendment, the text of the State Constitution was not changed until 1923.

Current constitution
With numerous later amendments, the 1851/1912 Constitution remains the basic law of the state to this day.

The current state constitution contains the following articles:
 Preamble - One of the shortest preambles of any state constitution:
"We, the people of the State of Ohio, grateful to Almighty God for our freedom, to secure its blessings and promote our general welfare, do establish this Constitution."
 Article I: Bill of Rights
The "Ohio Constitution Bill of Rights" consists of 23 sections. The Ohio Constitution's Bill of Rights is substantially similar to its federal counterpart but also includes the right to alter, reform or abolish government; rights of conscience and education; rights for victims of crime; a prohibition of imprisonment for debt; and the right to payment of damages for wrongful death.  
 Article II - Legislative
 Article III - Executive
 Article IV - Judicial
 Article V - Elective Franchise
In 1995 Article V, Section 8 was struck down as unconstitutional by the Supreme Court of the United States in U.S. Term Limits, Inc. v. Thornton. It had imposed term limits on federal representatives and senators.
 Article VI - Education
 Article VII - Public Institutions
 Article VIII - Public Debt and Public Works
 Article IX - Militia
 Article X - County and Township Organizations
 Article XI - Apportionment
 Article XII - Finance and Taxation
 Article XIII - Corporations
 Article XIV - Jurisprudence (repealed)
 Article XV - Miscellaneous
 Article XVI - Amendments
 Article XVII - Elections
 Article XVIII - Municipal Corporations

Article XIX - Congressional Redistricting 
Article XIX was added by a referendum in 2018. It passed with nearly 75% of the vote. The article requires a 3/5 vote of the state legislature to approve any redistricting plan, provided that half of each party votes in favor. If the legislature cannot reach an agreement, a commission creates a plan. This plan must receive approval from four members, including two members from each of the two largest political parties. If the commission cannot reach an agreement, the legislature may pass a plan by a simple majority vote. The article also lays out certain requirements for districts, including mandating partisan neutrality and limiting county and municipality splits. The state supreme court has sole jurisdiction over the constitutionality of any plan passed. 

Article XIX first took effect in January 2021 and governed the state's redistricting cycle that year. The legislature failed to create a plan, forcing the redistricting commission to take charge. The commission also failed to reach an agreement, turning the job back to the legislature. Eventually, the legislature passed a new map by simple majority vote. However, the state supreme court rejected the maps, finding it unconstitutionally favored Republicans. The legislature refused to adopt new maps, sending the process back to the commission. The commission adopted the final set of maps in March 2022. In July, the state supreme court again rejected the maps. However, because congressional primaries had already occurred, the maps will be used for the 2022 election.

See also
 Law of Ohio

References

External links

 Ohio's Secretary of State is the custodian of amendments to the Ohio constitution (see Art. XVI, § 1 and O.R.C. § 3501.05 and § 111.08), and maintains an online copy here: https://www.sos.state.oh.us/globalassets/publications/election/constitution.pdf 
 The original constitution documents are held by the Ohio Historical Society, as mandated by Ohio's General Assembly (O.R.C. § 111.08).  The OHS has online copies of the originals' text.
 Ohio's legislature also maintains an online copy of the constitution.
 Cleveland-Marshall College of Law Professor Steven Steinglass and Law Librarian Sue Altmeyer maintain The Ohio Constitution Law and History Web Site.  The site has links to historical versions of the Constitution and Constitutional Conventions; a Table of Proposed Amendments and Votes, with ballot or amendment language, where available; current Ohio Supreme Court decisions and upcoming cases pertaining to the Ohio Constitution and a bibliography of relevant books and articles.

 
Legal history of Ohio
Government of Ohio
Ohio
Ohio law